Duško Stanojević is a Serbian sprint canoer  who has competed since the late 2000s. He won a bronze medal in the K-2 500 m event at the 2010 ICF Canoe Sprint World Championships in Poznań.

References
2010 ICF Canoe Sprint World Championships men's K-2 500 m A final results. - accessed 22 August 2010.

Living people
Serbian male canoeists
Year of birth missing (living people)
ICF Canoe Sprint World Championships medalists in kayak

Mediterranean Games bronze medalists for Serbia
Competitors at the 2009 Mediterranean Games
Mediterranean Games medalists in canoeing